Arvède Barine (17 November 1840 – 14 November 1908), was a French writer and historian. Arvède Barine was the pseudonym of Mme. Charles Vincens, born Louise-Cécile Bouffé on 17 November 1840. She mostly wrote on the subject of women, but she also wrote about travel, the political issues of the day, and the fantastic literature of authors such as Edgar Allan Poe and E. T. A. Hoffmann. She died on 14 November 1908 in Paris.

Works
Translation of Tolstoy's "Souvenirs" (1886)
"Portraits de Femmes" (1887, 3rd. ed. 1902)
"Essais et Fantaisies" (1888)
 "Névrosés" (1898)
"Princesses et Grandes Dames" (1890, 6th. ed. 1902)
"Bernardin de Saint-Pierre" (1891)
"Alfred de Musset" (1893, 3rd. ed. 1900)
The Life of Alfred de Musset, English translation by Charles Conner Hayden, (1906), Published by Edwin Hill Co.
"Louis XIV et la Grande Mademoiselle (1652-1693)" (1905)

References

External links

 
 
 

1840 births
1908 deaths
Writers from Paris
19th-century French women writers
French art historians
19th-century French essayists
Pseudonymous women writers
Members of the Ligue de la patrie française
Chevaliers of the Légion d'honneur
Women art historians
French women historians
19th-century pseudonymous writers